This is a list of singles that have peaked in the top 10 of the Billboard Hot 100 during 1959.

Frankie Avalon and Ricky Nelson each had five top-ten hits in 1959, tying them for the most top-ten hits during the year.

Top-ten singles

1958 peaks

1960 peaks

See also
 1959 in music
 List of Hot 100 number-one singles of 1959 (U.S.)
 Billboard Year-End Hot 100 singles of 1959

References

General sources

 Whitburn, Joel. The Billboard Pop Charts, 1955–1959
Joel Whitburn Presents the Billboard Hot 100 Charts: The Sixties
Additional information obtained can be verified within Billboard's online archive services and print editions of the magazine.

1959
United States Hot 100 Top 10